The 2024 Copa América will be the 48th edition of the Copa América, the quadrennial international men's association football championship organized by South America's football ruling body CONMEBOL. The tournament will be held in the United States and will be co-organized by CONCACAF.

Argentina are the defending champions.

Host country
The 2024 Copa América had been expected to be hosted by Ecuador due to CONMEBOL's host rotation order. However, CONMEBOL president Alejandro Domínguez said Ecuador had been nominated but not yet chosen to organize the edition. In November 2022, the country declined to host the tournament. Peru and the United States had both expressed interest in organizing the tournament. On 27 January 2023 it was announced that as part of CONCACAF and CONMEBOL's new strategic partnership, the United States would host the tournament with six CONCACAF teams qualifying through the 2023–24 CONCACAF Nations League.

Teams
The tournament will include sixteen teams – ten from CONMEBOL and six from CONCACAF. All ten CONMEBOL national teams are eligible to enter:

The six CONCACAF participants will qualify through the 2023–24 CONCACAF Nations League. The teams will be the four League A quarter-final winners, and two play-in round winners between the four losing quarter-finalists. The United States, despite being the hosts, will not qualify automatically.

Broadcasters

References

External links
 

Copa América tournaments
Copa America 2024
International association football competitions hosted by the United States
2024 in South American football
2024 in American soccer